Teresa Roncon (born in Angola) is a Canadian former journalist.  She was a personality on Discovery Channel Canada, and formerly a CFTO (CTV Toronto) reporter.  Prior to both, she was a VJ on MuchMusic.

References

External links 
 Inaugural Celebrating Outstanding Portuguese-Canadian Achievement Awards, accessed 11 November 2008

Living people
Year of birth missing (living people)
Angolan emigrants to Canada
Canadian television journalists
Much (TV channel) personalities
Canadian people of Angolan descent
Canadian women television journalists
Canadian VJs (media personalities)
Canadian women television personalities